The Bolivian tyrannulet (Zimmerius bolivianus) is a species of bird in the family Tyrannidae. It is found in Bolivia and Peru. Its natural habitat is subtropical or tropical moist montane forests.

References

Bolivian tyrannulet
Birds of the Peruvian Andes
Birds of the Bolivian Andes
Bolivian tyrannulet
Taxonomy articles created by Polbot